Manish Asija is an Indian politician and a member of the 18th Uttar Pradesh Assembly and also 17th Uttar Pradesh Assembly and Sixteenth Legislative Assembly of Uttar Pradesh in India. He represents the Firozabad constituency of Uttar Pradesh and is a member of the Bharatiya Janata Party political party. He has also previously served as the mayor of Firozabad twice.

Early life and education
Manish Asija was born in Firozabad district. He attended the  S.R.K. (P.G.) College and attained Bachelor of Arts degree.

Political career
Manish Asija has been a MLA for three terms. He represented the Firozabad constituency and is a member of the Bharatiya Janata Party political party.

Posts held

See also

 Firozabad (Assembly constituency)
 Sixteenth Legislative Assembly of Uttar Pradesh
 Uttar Pradesh Legislative Assembly

References 

Uttar Pradesh MLAs 2012–2017
Uttar Pradesh MLAs 2017–2022
People from Firozabad district
1964 births
Living people
Bharatiya Janata Party politicians from Uttar Pradesh
Uttar Pradesh MLAs 2022–2027